Favorite was the 44-gun  frigate Favorita of the Navy of the Kingdom of Italy.

Career 

On 12 March 1811, Favorite, under Bernard Dubourdieu, led a frigate squadron to raid the British commerce raider base of the island of Lissa. The squadron encountered William Hoste's frigate squadron, leading to the Battle of Lissa.

In the ensuing fight, Favorite attempted to board the British flagship , distancing herself from the rest of her squadron. As the two ships neared, Amphion discharged a howitzer full of bullets which rendered a large number of the French casualties. Dubourdieu himself was killed at 9:10. Favorites first officer and second officers were killed as they attempted again to board Amphion. As she sailed around Amphion in an attempt to rake her and take her in a crossfire with the other French frigates, Favorite was outmanoeuvred and ran aground.

Her crew set her on fire, and she exploded as the battle was still ongoing. Led by colonel Gifflinga, the crew of Favorite captured a coastal boat at Port St George which they used to flee to Lessina.

References

External links 
  

Age of Sail frigates of France
Shipwrecks in the Adriatic Sea
Maritime incidents in 1811
Ships built in Venice
1810 ships
Pallas-class frigates (1808)